Julián Pérez (born 1888) was a Cuban pitcher in the Negro leagues and the Cuban League in the 1900s and 1910s.

A native of Havana, Cuba, Pérez played in the Cuban League between 1907 and 1909 for the Habana and Carmelita clubs. He made his Negro league debut in 1910 for the Cuban Stars (West), and played for the Stars again the following season.

References

External links
 and Seamheads

1888 births
Date of birth missing
Year of death missing
Place of death missing
Carmelita players
Cuban Stars (West) players
Habana players
Baseball pitchers
Baseball players from Havana
Cuban expatriate baseball players in the United States